The 1971 West Texas State Buffaloes football team was an American football team that represented West Texas State University (now known as West Texas A&M University) as a member of the Missouri Valley Conference during the 1971 NCAA University Division football season. In their first year under head coach Gene Mayfield, the team compiled a 2–9 record (1–3 in the MVC).

Schedule

References

West Texas State
West Texas A&M Buffaloes football seasons
West Texas State Buffaloes football